Pouilly-sur-Loire is an Appellation d'Origine Contrôlée (AOC) for white wine in the Loire Valley region of France. It is specifically produced around Pouilly-sur-Loire in the Nièvre department and was awarded AOC status by a decree issued on 31 July 1937

Geography
The vineyards cover  on the right bank of the Loire, opposite the Sancerre vineyards.

The appellation's area covers the communes of Garchy, Mesves-sur-Loire, Pouilly-sur-Loire, Saint-Andelain, Saint-Laurent-l'Abbaye, Saint-Martin-sur-Nohain and Tracy-sur-Loire in the Nièvre department.

Description
Pouilly-sur-Loire is mainly produced from Chasselas grapes, with Sauvignon Blanc as a supplementary variety. (Its more famous neighbours Sancerre and Pouilly-Fumé are made from Sauvignon Blanc only.)

It is a pale yellow in colour. The wine is light and lively.

References

Further reading
 Colette Hanicotte: Vins et vignobles de France. Éditions Larousse, Paris 1997 - 2001.

Loire AOCs